The 2000–01 South Pacific cyclone season was an event in the annual cycle of tropical cyclone formation. It began on November 1, 2000, and ended on April 30, 2001. These dates conventionally delimit the period of each year when most tropical cyclones form in the southern Pacific Ocean east of 160°E. Additionally, the regional tropical cyclone operational plan defines a tropical cyclone year separately from a tropical cyclone season, and the "tropical cyclone year" runs from July 1, 2000, to June 30, 2001.

Tropical cyclones between 160°E and 120°W and north of 25°S are monitored by the Fiji Meteorological Service in Nadi. Those that move south of 25°S are monitored by the Tropical Cyclone Warning Centre in Wellington, New Zealand.



Seasonal summary 

During the 2000–01 South Pacific cyclone season, only four tropical cyclones and one severe tropical cyclone formed. Compared to an average season, which generally features nine tropical cyclones and four to five severe tropical cyclones, the 2000–01 season was substantially below average. The season itself began unusually late, with the first system developing on February 20; however, according to the JTWC, a brief tropical storm existed between February 16 and 18.

Systems

Tropical Depression 01F 

Two people were killed in Fiji as a result of severe flooding.

Tropical Depression 07F 

A brief tropical storm was monitored by the Joint Typhoon Warning Center just off the northern coast of New Caledonia.

Tropical Cyclone Oma 

Cyclone Oma formed on February 20, dissipated on February 22.

Severe Tropical Cyclone Paula 

Formed on February 26, dissipated on March 4.

Three people were killed by the storm, two in Vanuatu and one in Fiji. Initial reports indicated that a young boy had been swept away near Santo and was presumed dead. However, the boy was found days later clinging to a rock. The two fatalities in the country resulted from fallen tree limbs on the islands of Epi and Ambae. Following an aerial assessment of damage in Vanuatu, Malampa and Shefa provinces in were declared disaster areas. In these provinces, nearly 50% of all homes sustained damage and upwards of a quarter of all buildings were impacted. In Fiji, damage from Paula was much less than initially feared; however, several homes in the Western Division were destroyed by rough seas produced by the storm. Elsewhere, structural damage was minimal and a few landslides resulted in damage to crops. Throughout the country, preliminary estimates placed the damage at US$800,000.

Following the storm, requests for assistance from the French government were made by Vanuatu. By March 5, a package of relief supplies, consisting of blankets, water purifiers and clothes was brought to the storm-battered nation.

Tropical Cyclone Rita 

On February 27, RSMC Nadi reported that Tropical Disturbance had developed within the South Pacific Convergence Zone to the southeast of the French Polynesian island Hao about 705 mi (1135 km) to the southeast of Papeete.

Tropical Depression 11F 

This depression existed from March 1 to March 3.

Tropical Depression 12F 

This depression existed from March 1 to March 3.

Tropical Cyclone Sose 

Formed on April 5, dissipated on April 11.

Tropical Depression 14F 

Formed on May 1, dissipated on May 3.

Other systems 
The following weak tropical disturbances/depressions were also monitored by RSMC Nadi, however these systems were either short lived or did not develop significantly. On December 18, RSMC Nadi started to monitor Tropical Depression 03F, to the southeast of Tahiti in French Polynesia.

Over the next couple of days the depression moved south-eastwards, before the final advisory was issued by RSMC Nadi on May 9.

Season effects 
This table lists all the storms that developed in the South Pacific to the east of longitude 160°E during the 2001–2002 season. It includes their intensity on the Australian Tropical cyclone intensity scale, duration, name, landfalls, deaths, and damages. All data is taken from RSMC Nadi and or TCWC Wellington. The Damage figures are all 2002 USD.

|-
|  || December 11–15 || bgcolor=#| || bgcolor=#|65 km/h (40 mph) || bgcolor=#| || Fiji || None || 2 ||
|-
|  || December 18–19 || bgcolor=#| || bgcolor=#| || bgcolor=#| || || || ||
|-
|  || February 16–18 || bgcolor=#| || bgcolor=#| || bgcolor=#| || || || ||
|-
|  || February 20–22 || bgcolor=#| || bgcolor=#| || bgcolor=#| || Cook Islands || Minor || None ||
|-
|  || February 26 – March 4 || bgcolor=#| || bgcolor=#| || bgcolor=#| || Solomon Islands, Vanuatu, Fiji, Tonga ||  || 2 ||
|-
|  || February 27 – March 5 || bgcolor=#| || bgcolor=#| || bgcolor=#| || || || ||
|-
|  || March 1–3 || bgcolor=#| || bgcolor=#| || bgcolor=#| || || || ||
|-
|  || March 1–3 || bgcolor=#| || bgcolor=#| || bgcolor=#| || || || ||
|-
|  || March 10 || bgcolor=#| || bgcolor=#| || bgcolor=#| || || || ||
|-
|  ||  || bgcolor=#| || bgcolor=#| || bgcolor=#| || Vanuatu, New Caledonia, Australia || || 4 ||
|-
|  ||  || bgcolor=#| || bgcolor=#| || bgcolor=#| || || || ||
|-
|  ||  || bgcolor=#| || bgcolor=#| || bgcolor=#| || || || ||
|-

See also 

 List of Southern Hemisphere tropical cyclone seasons
 Atlantic hurricane seasons: 2000, 2001
 Pacific hurricane seasons: 2000, 2001
 Pacific typhoon seasons: 2000, 2001
 North Indian Ocean cyclone seasons: 2000, 2001

References

External links 

 
South Pacific cyclone seasons
Articles which contain graphical timelines
2000 Spac
2001 Spac